Chandrasinh Hirjee Jewraj (1924–1989), known simply as Chandu The Stylist, was an Indian amateur billiards and snooker player. He represented Bengal and India in domestic and world championships - the World Amateur Billiards Championship  and the World Amateur Snooker Championship. He won the inaugural World Amateur Snooker Championship held at Kolkata (then Calcutta) in 1958. He was also Indian Open Billiards Championship winner in 1946, 47, 56 and 58, runner-up in 1952, 54, 55, 57 and Indian Snooker Championship runner-up in 1952, 53, 54, 55, 56, 57 and 58.

References

External links
 Big breaks are back in Indian billiards
 Wilson Jones world title remembered with pomp
 Refreshing change
 No. 2 INDIAN PLAYER BEATS BOB MARSHALL
 Another stage for Indian billiards chauvinism

1925 births
Sportspeople from Kolkata
1989 deaths
Indian players of English billiards
Indian snooker players
Cue sports players from West Bengal